Stuart MacRae (born June 25, 1982) is a Canadian professional ice hockey forward who is currently a free agent.

Career 
MacRae began his professional playing career with the Fresno Falcons of the ECHL, joining them for the 2006–07 ECHL playoffs. After splitting the 2007–08 season with the ECHL’s Gwinnett Gladiators and the Fresno Falcons, he moved to the Central Hockey League with Amarillo Gorillas in 2008 and remained for two seasons.

MacRae joined the Cardiff Devils of the Elite Ice Hockey League in the United Kingdom in 2010 and became a popular player during his three seasons with the team, scoring 71 goals and 136 assists for 207 points in 159 games. He became team captain for the Devils during the 2012–13 season. He then moved to the Odense Bulldogs in the Metal Ligaen, the premier league in Danish ice hockey.

References

External links

1982 births
Living people
Amarillo Gorillas players
Canadian ice hockey forwards
Cardiff Devils players
Canadian expatriate ice hockey players in Wales
Fresno Falcons players
Gwinnett Gladiators players
Odense Bulldogs players
Canadian expatriate ice hockey players in the United States
Canadian expatriate ice hockey players in Denmark